Monika Smolková (born 6 October 1956) is a Slovak politician. Since 2009 she has been a Member of the European Parliament, where she is a member of the Progressive Alliance of Socialists and Democrats (S&D). Smolková has held various positions within public office in Slovakia including being elected a member of the National Council in 2006.

References

1956 births
Living people
People from Prešov District
Direction – Social Democracy MEPs
21st-century Slovak women politicians
21st-century Slovak politicians
Women MEPs for Slovakia
MEPs for Slovakia 2009–2014
MEPs for Slovakia 2014–2019
Members of the National Council (Slovakia) 2006-2010
Female members of the National Council (Slovakia)